David 'Dai' Gwynn (28 December 1861 – 8 March 1910) was a Welsh international rugby union wing who played club rugby for Swansea, and county rugby for Lancashire. Gwynn played for Wales on six occasions and was the brother of William Gwynn, who also played international rugby for Wales.

Background
Gwynn was born in Swansea, Wales, and he died aged 48 in Swansea, Wales.

Rugby career 
Gwynn made his first club appearance for Swansea in 1878 and in 1882 he was part of the third Welsh national team. Under the captaincy of Charles Lewis, this was the first home game played by Wales, and the match at St. Helen's ended in another defeat by Wales at the hands of the English. This was Gwynn's last international match for just over four years, and during this period his brother played for Wales five times and the brothers never played in the same team national team together. When Gwynn was selected again, it was for the 1887 Home Nations Championship in a game against Scotland. Gwynn found himself on the losing side for a second time and was forced to wait another three years before his was selected to play for his country again. When Gwynn was reselected he was chosen to face England as part of the 1890 Championship, which saw Wales beat the English for the very first time, thanks to a try from William Stadden. This was followed by a draw against Ireland as part of the same tournament.

Gwynn played two final games for Wales, the Scotland and Ireland matches of the 1891 Championship. Gwynn moved north and played for Oldham during this period, though continued to turn out for Swansea when he could. He was joined at Oldham by William McCutcheon who not only played for Swansea, but also represented Lancashire with Gwynn at county level. When Gwynn left the sport of rugby, he became heavily associated with Swansea Cricket Club and umpired for the club.

International matches played
Wales
 1882, 1890, 1891
 1887, 1891
 1890

Change of Code
When Oldham converted from the rugby union code to the rugby league code on Thursday 29 August 1895, David Gwynn would have been approximately 34 years of age. Consequently, he may have been both a rugby union, and rugby league footballer for Oldham.

Bibliography

References

External links
Search for "Gwynn" at rugbyleagueproject.org
Statistics at orl-heritagetrust.org.uk (statistics missing, inferring he didn't play post-1895 in the Northern Union (rugby league))

1861 births
1910 deaths
Lancashire County RFU players
Oldham R.L.F.C. players
Rugby union players from Swansea
Rugby union wings
Swansea RFC players
Wales international rugby union players
Welsh cricket umpires
Welsh rugby union players